Alamire may refer to:

 Pierre Alamire, Flemish music copyist
 Alamire (consort), medieval and Renaissance music group
 Alamire, note name, see Guidonian hand